GT World Challenge Europe (known as the Blancpain GT Series between 2014 and 2019) is a sports car racing series organised by SRO Motorsports Group. It features grand tourer racing cars modified from production road cars complying with the FIA's GT3 regulations.

The series is divided into two separate championships, the GT World Challenge Europe Sprint Cup and the GT World Challenge Europe Endurance Cup, with five weekends each for 2022. Each race meeting focuses on Sprint Cup OR Endurance Cup exclusively.

History
Although the GT World Challenge Europe Endurance Cup (then the Blancpain Endurance Series) has been organised since 2011, the inaugural season of the Blancpain GT Series was 2014, because in that year the FIA GT Series became the Blancpain Sprint Series, which is now the GT World Challenge Europe Sprint Cup. The series was primarily sponsored by Swiss watchmaker Blancpain.

After developing their partnership, Blancpain and the SRO have decided that 2016 will see both the Sprint and Endurance Series further integrated into the Blancpain GT Series, putting the emphasis on the prestigious overall drivers' and manufacturers' titles, and causing the Sprint Series name to change from Blancpain Sprint Series to Blancpain GT Series Sprint Cup and the Endurance Series name to change from Blancpain Endurance Series to Blancpain GT Series Endurance Cup.

In 2019, SRO Group announced that their sponsorship agreement with Blancpain had come to an end, this resulted in the Blancpain GT Series being renamed the GT World Challenge Europe with the Blancpain GT Series Endurance Cup and Blancpain GT World Challenge Europe being renamed the GT World Challenge Europe Endurance Cup and Sprint Cup respectively.

Champions

Drivers

Teams

See also
 GT World Challenge Europe Endurance Cup
 GT World Challenge Europe Sprint Cup

References

External links

 
Sports car racing series
2014 establishments in Europe